The 211th Aviation Regiment is an aviation regiment of the U.S. Army.  It is based in West Jordan, Utah at South Valley Regional Airport, and consist of two battalions.

Structure

 1st Battalion (Attack Reconnaissance) (AH-64). Nicknamed the "Air Pirates". 
 Afghanistan 2020 (TF Ivy Eagle)
 Headquarters and Headquarters Company at Army Aviation Support Facility, South Valley Regional Airport, (UT ARNG)
 Company A at Army Aviation Support Facility, South Valley Regional Airport, (UT ARNG)
 Company B "Buccaneers" at Army Aviation Support Facility, South Valley Regional Airport, (UT ARNG)
 Afghanistan from June 2004 / HQ at Kandahar part of Joint Task Force Wings (UT ARNG).
 Company C at Army Aviation Support Facility, South Valley Regional Airport, (UT ARNG)
 Company D at Army Aviation Support Facility, South Valley Regional Airport, (UT ARNG) 
 Company E at Army Aviation Support Facility, South Valley Regional Airport, (UT ARNG)
 2nd Battalion (General Support)
 Company A at Army Aviation Support Facility, South Valley Regional Airport, (UT ARNG)
 Company B (CH-47) 
 Detachment 1 at Davenport (IA ARNG)
 Detachment 2 (MN ARNG)
 Company C (UH-60) "Northstar Dustoff"
 Detachment 1 at Waterloo (IA ARNG)
 Detachment 2 (MN ARNG)
 Company D (Aviation Support) at Army Aviation Support Facility, South Valley Regional Airport, (UT ARNG)
 Detachment 1 at Davenport (IA ARNG)
 Detachment 3 at Waterloo (IA ARNG)
 Company E (Field Services) at Army Aviation Support Facility, South Valley Regional Airport, (UT ARNG)
 Detachment 1 at Davenport (IA ARNG)
 Detachment 3 at Waterloo (IA ARNG)
 Company F (AR ARNG)
Company G (UH-60) (WY ARNG)
 Detachment 1 at Army Aviation Support Facility, South Valley Regional Airport, (UT ARNG)

References

Citations

Bibliography

211